The International 3000 Series is a transit-style (Type D) bus chassis manufactured by Navistar International, used for school bus and commercial bus applications. In production since 1990, it has been produced in both front and rear-engine configurations.

3000

Introduced in 1996 as a chassis for the AmTran RE, the 3000 was the first rear-engine bus chassis produced in nearly 20 years.  Aside from a few buses bodied by Corbeil in the late 1990s, this chassis has been used exclusively by AmTran and its Navistar corporate successor IC Bus.  In production for 20 years unchanged, it has one of the longest production runs of a bus chassis in North America. Just like the FE, the RE would be redesigned in 2003 after the rebranding of AmTran to IC Bus.  

From 1996 to 2016, the 3000 was powered exclusively by International diesel engines.  Introduced with the T444E V8 engine, the engine lineup was expanded in 1997 to include the DT engine family and successor V8 engines, including the VT365. In 2017, the Maxxforce DT engine was replaced with the Cummins L9 due to the failed EGR strategy of the International Diesel engines. Production of the ICRE is slated to discontinue in 2024.

3900

Introduced as the replacement for the long-running International Harvester 1853FC forward-control chassis, the 3900 was first produced in 1990.  Along with its IHC predecessor, many body manufacturers sourced the 3900 as the replacement for the discontinued General Motors S7 and Asia-Smith Motors forward-control chassis.  By the mid-1990s, Navistar subsidiary AmTran became the sole user of the 3900. The FE was redesigned for the 1999 model year. The warning light caps and the back were redesigned after AmTran renamed themselves to IC Bus in 2003. It would later also be updated in 2008.  In 2010, production of front-engine bus chassis was discontinued.

All 3900 chassis were powered by variations of the DT engine family.

Powertrain
While a bare chassis instead of a cowled chassis, the 3900/3000 maintained mechanical commonality with the 3800 conventional.  This included shared powertrain and suspension components, while interior parts included Navistar instrument panels and steering columns.  The 3800 itself was based on the International 4700/4900.

As Navistar abandoned its use of MaxxForce engines (due to the use of EGR emissions treatment systems), the company announced that the MaxxForceDT was replaced by the Cummins L9 for 2017 production.

Engine

Navistar T444E
Navistar DT466E
Navistar DT530E (1996-2002, Available in RE configuration only)
Navistar VT365 (ICRE & ICCE only)
Navistar MaxxForce DT
Navistar MaxxForce 9 (IC RC only)
Cummins L9 (2017- 2024) (ICRE only)

Transmission

Unlike the 3800 conventional, the 3000/3900 were only produced with automatic transmissions.

Allison AT545
Allison MT643
Allison World Transmission (MD3060/3560)
Allison 3000PTS Transmission
Allison 2500 Transmission

Availability

See also 

 List of buses

References 

School bus chassis
3000
Vehicles introduced in 1990